Senator Jenkins may refer to:

Andrew Jenkins (politician) (born 1941), New York State Senate
Bruce Sterling Jenkins (born 1927), Utah State Senate
Clark Jenkins (born 1948), North Carolina State Senate
Evan Jenkins (politician) (born 1960), West Virginia State Senate
John Jenkins (American politician) (born 1952), Maine State Senate
Lynn Jenkins (born 1963), Kansas State Senate
Perry W. Jenkins (1867–1955), Wyoming State Senate
Scott K. Jenkins (born 1950), Utah State Senate
Thomas A. Jenkins (1880–1959), Ohio State Senate
William Jenkins (Northern Ireland politician) (born 1904), Northern Irish Senate